The Evangelical Lutheran Diocese of North America (ELDoNA) is a confessional Lutheran church body in the United States. There are twenty-eight pastors in the diocese, serving congregations in Alaska, Arkansas, Florida, Georgia, Illinois, Michigan, Minnesota, Missouri, New Mexico, North Carolina, Oregon, South Carolina, Tennessee, Texas, and Wisconsin plus Colombia and the Philippines.

The ELDoNA was founded June 6, 2006 at a meeting held at Salem Lutheran Church, Malone, Texas. A second diocesan synod was held August 28 and 29, 2007. The third diocesan synod was held at Christ Lutheran Church in Richmond, Missouri on May 22, 2008, and the fourth in the same location, May 14–15, 2009. For the fifth Colloquium and Synod, the diocese returned to Malone, Texas, May 12–15, 2010, and met there again for the sixth Colloquium and Synod May 11–13, 2011. The sixth Colloquium and Synod was the first in which all but one of the pastors of the diocese and the entire clergy of the Association of Confessional Lutheran Churches (ACLC) were in attendance. Among the significant decisions of the 2011 synod was the resolution to open a diocesan seminary in September 2012; the 2012 synod chose to delay that planned opening to 2014. The 2012 synod took place at Salem Lutheran Church in Malone, Texas the week of April 23–27, 2012, and the 2013 synod took place April 29–May 3, 2013.

In August 2013 the ACLC broke fellowship with the ELDoNA due to the latter's stand on the doctrine of Objective Justification.

In 2006, James Heiser was called to serve as the diocesan bishop. Heiser has published a volume of essays on the doctrine of the holy ministry entitled Stewards of the Mysteries of God.  He is also the author of a study of the neo-Platonic revival which took place during the Italian Renaissance, entitled Prisci Theologi and the Hermetic Reformation in the Fifteenth Century.

In 2013, Repristination Press published a volume of essays by Pastor John Rutowicz which sets forth the diocesan understanding of the episcopal office: Holding Fast the Faithful Word: Episcopacy and the Office of the Holy Ministry in the Evangelical Lutheran Diocese of North America.

The diocese produces The Lutheran Herald, a monthly devotional journal that also includes diocesan news.

References

External links
Evangelical Lutheran Diocese of North America Website
News of Fellowship Between the ELDoNA and the ACLC
ELDoNA responds to the Actions of the ELCA 2009 Churchwide Assembly
Wittenberg Door commentary
Mars Society Bio of Bp. Heiser
American Lutheran Publicity Bureau Discussion of the ELDoNA

Lutheran denominations in North America
Religious organizations established in 2006
Lutheran denominations established in the 21st century
Lutheranism in the United States
2006 establishments in Texas